Great American Road Trip is a reality television competition series that aired on NBC. It follows seven families as they go on a road trip and compete against each other at different landmarks in and around U.S. Route 66 in the United States.  The series is hosted by comedian Reno Collier.

The show premiered on July 7, 2009 as the lead-in to America's Got Talent.  However, due to poor ratings, NBC moved the show to Monday nights, with the next episode coming less than a week later.  In the second week, ratings declined about 10 percent, as seen in the chart below.

Structure
The families are given recreational vehicles for use throughout the competition.  They drive from place to place to compete in various challenges.  There are two contests each week.  The first is the "King of the Road" challenge, in which the winner receives a reward, and the second is the "End of the Road" challenge, in which the losing team goes home.

Families
The following families are in the competition. They are listed with their hometowns:

Locations

Episode One
Wrigley Field, Chicago, Illinois
Illinois State Fair, Springfield, Illinois
Gateway Arch, St. Louis, Missouri

Episode Two
Ted Drewes Frozen Custard, St. Louis, Missouri
Meramec Caverns, Stanton, Missouri
Welk Family Theater, Branson, Missouri
Route 66 Drive-In Theatre, Carthage, Missouri

Episode Three
The Little House on the Prairie Home, Independence, Kansas
Red Buffalo Ranch, Sedan, Kansas
The Big Texan Steak Ranch, Amarillo, Texas

Episode Four
Midpoint Café, Adrian, Texas
Albuquerque International Sunport, Albuquerque, New Mexico
Wigwam Resort (Coote family), Litchfield Park, Arizona
Wigwam Motel, Holbrook, Arizona

Episode Five
Slide Rock State Park, Oak Creek Canyon (near Sedona, Arizona)
Grand Canyon National Park, Fredonia, Arizona (North Rim) and Grand Canyon, Arizona (South Rim)
Grand Canyon Railway, Williams, Arizona

Episode Six
Roadkill Café, Seligman, Arizona
Hoover Dam, Boulder City, Nevada
Rio Hotel Theatre, Las Vegas, Nevada

These hotels were locations during the scavenger hunt:
Circus Circus, Las Vegas, Nevada
Excalibur, Las Vegas, Nevada
Mandalay Bay, Las Vegas, Nevada

Episode Seven
Bootleg Canyon Mountain Bike Park, Boulder City, Nevada
Oatman Ghost Town, Oatman, Arizona
Soggy Dry Lake Bed, Johnson Valley, California

Episode Eight
Los Angeles International Airport, Los Angeles, California
Universal Studios Hollywood, Universal City, California
Roosevelt Hotel, Hollywood, Los Angeles, California
Santa Monica Pier, Santa Monica, California

Episodes

*:  In episode two, no teams were eliminated. Instead, the top three teams in the King of the Road challenge (Pollards, Cootes, and Ricos) faced off in a second challenge, with the winning team receiving a prize.  The Cootes received a trip to an upcoming movie premiere in Hollywood.
*:  In episode 6, instead of an End of the Road challenge, the top 2 families compete for the luxury.
*:  In episode 7, there were only 2 teams in the bottom instead of 3.

Elimination chart

Other details

Episode 2
The judges for the talent show were Andy Williams, Yakov Smirnoff, and Raeanne Presley, the mayor of Branson.
After the second reward challenge in Episode 2, the families were treated to an advance screening of the Twentieth Century Fox movie Aliens in the Attic.

Ratings

References

External links
Great American Road Trip on NBC.com

2009 American television series debuts
2000s American reality television series
2009 American television series endings
NBC original programming
Television shows filmed in Illinois
Television shows filmed in Missouri
Television shows filmed in Kansas
Television shows filmed in Texas
Television shows filmed in New Mexico
Television shows filmed in Arizona
Television shows filmed in Nevada
Television shows filmed in California